Kadkhodalu-ye Bala (also Romanized as Kadkhodālū-ye Bālā; also known as Kadkhodālū-ye ‘Olyā) is a village in Bastamlu Rural District, in the Central District of Khoda Afarin County, East Azerbaijan Province, Iran. At the 2006 census, its population was 368, in 71 families.

References 

Populated places in Khoda Afarin County